Petralia Soprana (Sicilian: Pitralìa Suprana) is a comune (municipality) in the Metropolitan City of Palermo in the Italian region Sicily, located about  southeast of Palermo.

The municipality of Petralia Soprana contains the frazioni (subdivisions, mainly villages and hamlets) Acquamara, Borgo Aiello, Borgo Pala, Cipampini, Cozzo Bianco, Fasanò, Gioiotti, Gulini, LoDico, Lucia, Madonnuzza, Miranti, Pellizzara, Pianello, Pira, San Giovanni, SS. Trinità, Sabatini, Saccù, Salaci, Salinella, Scarcini, Scarpella, Serra di Lio, Stretti, Verdi I e Verdi II, and Villa Letizia.

Petralia Soprana borders the following municipalities: Alimena, Blufi, Bompietro, Gangi, Geraci Siculo, Petralia Sottana.

Demographic evolution

References

Municipalities of the Metropolitan City of Palermo